Leonard Leroy Willis (born March 4, 1953) is a retired American football player.  He played college football at Ohio State and was drafted by the Minnesota Vikings in the 4th round of the 1976 NFL Draft.  He was a wide receiver and kick returner for the Minnesota Vikings, New Orleans Saints and Buffalo Bills from 1976 to 1979.

College career
Willis played for the Ohio State Buckeyes in 1974 and 1975 after transferring from junior college.  His teammates with the Buckeyes included 2-time Heisman Trophy winner Archie Griffin, fellow wide receiver Brian Baschnagel, fullback Pete Johnson and safety Tim Fox, and his quarterback was Cornelius Greene.  In 1974, he was clocked as the fastest Buckeye football player ever until that time, running the 100-yard dash in 9.3 seconds.  Besides playing as a receiver he also returned kicks and even played some free safety for the Buckeyes.  In 1974, he did not catch a pass, but ran 11 times for 146 yards, a 13.3 yards per rush average.  In 1975, he caught 17 passes for 350 yards, a 20.6 yards per catch average, with 2 touchdowns.  His receiving yards and touchdowns were each good enough to rank 8th in the Big Ten Conference.  The Buckeyes won the Big Ten Conference championship in both his years with the team, but lost in the Rose Bowl each season.

Professional career
Willis was drafted by the Minnesota Vikings with the 118th pick in the 4th round of the 1976 NFL Draft.  Willis played in all 14 regular season games for the Vikings in 1976, primarily as a kick returner.  He returned 24 kickoffs for 552 yards, a 23.0 yard average.  He also returned 30 punts for 207 yards, a 6.9 yard average.  He also played in all 3 playoff games for the Vikings, as the Vikings won the NFC Championship, primarily returning punts and kickoffs.  In Super Bowl XI against the Oakland Raiders Willis returned 3 kickoffs for 57 yards (a 19.0 yard average) and 3 punts for 14 yards (a 4.7 yard average).

In 1977 Willis played for both the New Orleans Saints and the Buffalo Bills, again primarily as a kick returner.  In 1978, playing for Buffalo, he only played in 4 games and returned just 1 kickoff.  But he also had his only 2 professional receptions that year, gaining 41 yards for a 20.5 yard average on those receptions.  He finished his career with Buffalo in 1979, playing 7 games and returning 4 kickoffs for 92 yards that season.

References

1953 births
Minnesota Vikings players
New Orleans Saints players
Buffalo Bills players
Ohio State Buckeyes football players
American football wide receivers
Players of American football from Washington, D.C.
Living people
Chicago Blitz players